Otto Bittelmann (August 5, 1911 – November 26, 2000) was a German politician of the Christian Democratic Union (CDU) and former member of the German Bundestag.

Life 
Bittelmann joined the CDU in 1961. He was deputy chairman of the CDU district association Fallingbostel and chairman of the agricultural committee of the CDU district association Lüneburg. Bittelmann was a council member of the municipality Bomlitz and a member of the district council of Fallingbostel. He was a member of the German Bundestag from 1969 to 1972. In parliament he represented the constituency of Hoya.

Literature

References

1911 births
2000 deaths
Members of the Bundestag for Lower Saxony
Members of the Bundestag 1969–1972
Members of the Bundestag for the Christian Democratic Union of Germany